Free indirect speech is a style of third-person narration which uses some of the characteristics of third-person along with the essence of first-person direct speech; it is also referred to as free indirect discourse, free indirect style, or, in French, discours indirect libre.

Free indirect speech has been described as a "technique of presenting a character's voice partly mediated by the voice of the author" (or, reversing the emphasis, "that the character speaks through the voice of the narrator") with the voices effectively merged. It has also been described as "the illusion by which third-person narrative comes to express...the intimate subjectivity of fictional characters." The word "free" in the phrase is used to capture the fact that with this technique, the author can "roam from viewpoint to viewpoint" instead of being fixed with one character or with the narrator.

According to British philologist Roy Pascal, Goethe and Jane Austen were the first novelists to use this style consistently and 19th-century French novelist Gustave Flaubert was the first to be aware of it as a style.

Naming 
Randall Stevenson suggests that the term free indirect discourse "is perhaps best reserved for instances where words have actually been spoken aloud" and that cases "where a character's voice is probably the silent inward one of thought" should be described as free indirect style.

Distinguishing marks of the technique 

Free indirect speech is characterized by these features:

 The lack of an introductory expression such as "he said" or "he thought". It is as if the subordinate clause carrying the content of the indirect speech were taken out of the main clause which contains it, becoming the main clause itself. 
 Free indirect speech can convey the character's words more directly than in normal indirect speech. Devices such as interjections and psycho-ostensive expressions like curses and swearwords can be used that cannot be normally used within a subordinate clause. When deictic pronouns and adverbials are used, they refer to the coordinates of the originator of the speech or thought, not of the narrator.
 "The anomalous presence within third-person, past-tense narrative of linguistic features indicating a character's perspective and voice."
 Backshifted exclamations, such as, "How differently did every thing now appear in which he was concerned", an example from Pride and Prejudice.
 Unshifted modals, such as, "She must own that she was tired of great houses", also from Pride and Prejudice.
 Exclamatory questions, character-specific locutions and syntactical informalities and fragments.

Free indirect discourse can be described as a "technique of presenting a character's voice partly mediated by the voice of the author", or, in the words of the French narrative theorist Gérard Genette, "the narrator takes on the speech of the character, or, if one prefers, the character speaks through the voice of the narrator, and the two instances then are merged".

Following are examples that use direct, indirect and free indirect speech:
 Quoted or direct speech: He laid down his bundle and thought of his misfortune. "And just what pleasure have I found, since I came into this world?" he asked.
 Reported or normal indirect speech: He laid down his bundle and thought of his misfortune. He asked himself what pleasure he had found since he came into the world.
 Free indirect speech: He laid down his bundle and thought of his misfortune. And just what pleasure had he found, since he came into this world?

Use in literature

Roy Pascal cites Goethe and Jane Austen as the first novelists to use this style consistently, and writes that Gustave Flaubert was the first to be aware of it as a style. This style would be widely imitated by later authors, called in French discours indirect libre. It is also known as estilo indirecto libre in Spanish, and is often used by Latin American writer Horacio Quiroga.

In German literature, the style, known as erlebte Rede (experienced speech), is perhaps most famous in the works of Franz Kafka, blurring the subject's first-person experiences with a grammatically third-person narrative perspective. Arthur Schnitzler's novella Leutnant Gustl first published in Neue Freie Presse newspaper in 1900 is considered the earliest book length example.

In Danish literature, the style is attested since Leonora Christina (1621–1698) (and is, outside literature, even today common in colloquial Danish speech).

Some of the first sustained examples of free indirect discourse in Western literature occur in Latin literature, where the phenomenon often takes the name of oratio obliqua. It is characteristic, for instance, of the style of Julius Caesar, but it is also found in the historical work of Livy.

English, Irish and Scottish literature
As stated above, Austen was one of its first practitioners. According to Austen scholar Tom Keymer, "It has been calculated that Pride and Prejudice filters its narrative, at different points, through no fewer than nineteen centres of consciousness, more than any other Austen novel (with Mansfield Park, at thirteen, the nearest competitor)."

The American novelist Edith Wharton relies heavily on the technique in her 1905 novel The House of Mirth. Irish author James Joyce also used free indirect speech in works such as "The Dead" (in Dubliners), A Portrait of the Artist as a Young Man, and Ulysses. 
Scottish author James Kelman uses the style extensively, most notably in his Booker Prize winning novel How Late It Was, How Late, but also in many of his short stories and some of his novels, most of which are written in Glaswegian speech patterns. Virginia Woolf in her novels To the Lighthouse and Mrs Dalloway frequently relies on free indirect discourse to take us into the minds of her characters. Another modernist, D. H. Lawrence, also makes frequent use of a free indirect style in "transcribing unspoken or even incompletely verbalized thoughts". Lawrence most often uses free indirect speech, a literary technique that describes the interior thoughts of the characters using third-person singular pronouns ('he' and 'she') in both The Rainbow and Women in Love. According to Charles Rzepka of Boston University, Elmore Leonard's mastery of free indirect discourse "is unsurpassed in our time, and among the surest of all time, even if we include Jane Austen, Gustave Flaubert, and Hemingway in the mix."

Some argue that free indirect discourse was also used by Chaucer in The Canterbury Tales. When the narrator says in "The General Prologue" that he agrees with the Monk's opinion dismissing criticism of his very unmonastic way of life, he is apparently paraphrasing the monk himself:

And I seyde his opinion was good:
What! Sholde he studie, and make himselven wood,
Upon a book in cloistre alwey to poure?
Or swinken with his handes, and laboure,
As Austin bit? How shal the world be served?
Lat Austin have his swink to him reserved!

These rhetorical questions may be regarded as the monk's own casual way of waving off criticism of his aristocratic lifestyle. Similar examples can be found in the narrator's portrait of the friar.

See also
Stream of consciousness (narrative mode)

References

Further reading
Cohn, Dorrit, Transparent Minds

Haberland, Hartmut, Indirect speech in Danish. In: F. Coulmas ed. Direct and indirect speech. 219-254. Berlin: Mouton de Gruyter, 1986
Mey, Jacob L., When Voices Clash. A Study in Literary Pragmatics. Berlin: Mouton de Gruyter, 2000.
Prince, Gerald, Dictionary of Narratology
Stevenson, Randall, Modernist Fiction. Lexington: University of Kentucky, 1992.
Wood, James, How Fiction Works. New York: Picador, 2009.
Ron, Moshe, "Free Indirect Discourse, Mimetic Language Games and the Subject of Fiction", Poetics Today, Vol. 2, No. 2, Narratology III: Narration and Perspective in Fiction (Winter, 1981), pp. 17-39

External links
The Literary Encyclopedia: Free Indirect Discourse

English grammar
Semantics
Linguistics
Narrative techniques